Kasagh is a river in the west-central region of modern Armenia which flows north to south. It originates near Mount Aragats in Aragatsotn province, flows south into Armavir province and into the Metsamor, which itself is a tributary of the Aras.

Sites along the river
From north to south:
 the town of Aparan
 the Aparan reservoir
 Saghmosavank, an Armenian monastic complex
 Hovhannavank, a 13th-century Armenian monastic complex
 the town of Ashtarak
 the town of Oshakan
 the city of Vagharshapat

Gallery

See also

List of lakes of Armenia
Geography of Armenia

References

Rivers of Armenia